Glenea albocingulata is a species of beetle in the family Cerambycidae. It was described by Per Olof Christopher Aurivillius in 1925. It is known from Java and Borneo.

References

albocingulata
Beetles described in 1925